Viktor Alexandrovich Lyapkalo (18 September 1956, Komi Republic) is a Russian and Soviet painter, who lives and works in Saint Petersburg.

Biography 

Viktor Alexandrovič Lyapkalo was born on 18 September 1956 in Uchta, Komi Republic. He graduated in 1978 from the Art School of Saratov. From 1979 to 1987 he studied at the Saint Petersburg Academy of Arts and had as teachers Vladimir Gorb and Viktor Reichet. He graduated from this institute, completing the work White Night as part of his undergraduate studies. He specialized in landscapes and nudes.

Since the '80s he has lived and worked in St. Petersburg and is a member of the Union of Artists of this city.

See also 
 Leningrad School of Painting
 List of 20th-century Russian painters
 List of painters of Saint Petersburg Union of Artists
 Saint Petersburg Union of Artists

References 

1956 births
20th-century Russian painters
Russian male painters
21st-century Russian painters
Soviet painters
Members of the Leningrad Union of Artists
Repin Institute of Arts alumni
Painters from Saint Petersburg
People from Ukhta
Living people
20th-century Russian male artists
21st-century Russian male artists